Tobias Svantesson (born 1 April 1963), is a former professional tennis player from Sweden.  He enjoyed most of his tennis success while playing doubles.  During his career he won 2 doubles titles.  He achieved a career-high doubles ranking of world No. 65 in 1991. His career high world ranking in singles was no 89.

He is the father of the professional soccer player Ian Svantesson.

Career finals

Doubles (2 titles, 1 runner-up)

References

External links
 
 

Swedish male tennis players
Sportspeople from Malmö
1963 births
Living people